Football is the most popular sport in Malaysia. Association football is a national sport in Malaysia, where the first modern set of rules for the code were established in 1921, which were a major influence on the development of the modern Laws of the Game. The sport of football in the country of Malaysia is run by the Football Association of Malaysia. The association administers the national football team as well as the national league.

In 1997, Malaysia hosted the FIFA U-20 World Cup, but known as FIFA World Youth Championship during that time. In 2007, Malaysia co-hosted the Asian Cup 2007 with three other countries.

The most significant successes of the national team of Malaysia has come in the regional AFF Suzuki Cup (formerly known as the 'Tiger Cup'), which Malaysia won in 2010 for the first time in history. They beat Indonesia 4–2 on aggregate in the final to capture the country's first major international football title.

Malaysia had many top players, such as the legendary Mokhtar Dahari and Sabah's Hassan Sani and James Wong, which led Malaysia into their golden age during the 1970s until the 1980s. Before Mokhtar, The Malaysian King of Football, Datuk Abdul Ghani Minhat was the most famous and respected footballer in the whole Malaya during the 1950s until the 1960s. Malaysia's 15–1 victory over the Philippines in 1962 is currently the record for the highest win for the national team. In the current generation, Mohd Safee Mohd Sali and Norshahrul Idlan Talaha are considered by Malaysians as their best striker pair.

In the FIFA World Rankings, Malaysia's highest standing was in the first release of the figures, in August 1993, at 75th. Malaysia's main rival on the international stage are their geographical neighbours, Indonesia and Singapore, and past matches between these two teams have produced much drama. Malaysia is one of the most successful teams in Southeast Asia along with Indonesia, Singapore, Thailand and Vietnam, winning the ASEAN Football Championship 2010 and other small competitions while improving at the same time.

History

1900 to 1978 

Football arrived in Malaysia, (Malaya at that time) with the British. The locals soon picked up the game, and before long it was the country's leading sport. Towards the end of the 19th century, football was one of the central pillars of most sports clubs in Malaya. But it was not structured. Even when the Selangor Amateur Football League took shape in 1905 – which ensured proper administration and organisation – the competition was confined only to clubs in the Kuala Lumpur.

The earliest known winners of football competition in Malaysia was in Penang which won by YMCA in 1906.

In January 1921, the British Royal Navy battleship H. M. S. Malaya called at Port Swettenham (now Port Klang), Singapore, Malacca, Penang and Port Dickson. During its stay, the crew competed in friendly matches in football, rugby, hockey, sailing and golf against local clubs.

Three months later, the Chief Secretary of the Federated Malay States government received a letter from Captain H. T. Buller of the H. M. S. Malaya, which offered two cups to be competed for in football and rugby as tokens of their gratitude for the reception they received in Malaya. The cup for football were then known as the Malaya Cup The offer was accepted and various club representatives met to organise the tournament. A Malaya Cup committee was set up and it was decided to run the football competition in northern and southern sections. The first tournament were entrusted to be run by the Selangor Club. The first ever Malaya Cup match was played on 20 August 1921, with Selangor defeating Penang 5–1 in front of an estimated crowd of 5,000 in Kuala Lumpur. The inaugural tournament were played by six teams and won by Singapore. During 1923, a newspaper described it as “by far the greatest sporting event of the year (in Malaya)”.

In 1933, Association football of Malaysia was founded as Football Association of Malaya (FAM) which managed the local football scene at that time. By 1954, FAM joins FIFA as a member in AFC.

Malaysia FAM Cup was established in 1952 as a secondary knockout competition to the more prestigious Malaya Cup, the competition were held between the state teams including Singapore, Police, Army, and Prisons Department of Malaysia in its early days.

In 1959, the Malaya Cup departed from the traditional one round tournament to a two-round home and away format in three zones, East, South and North.

FAM changed its name to Football Association of Malaysia (FAM) in the early 1960s to inline with the formation of Malaysia. A new trophy for Malaya Cup was inaugurated in 1967, and since then the competition has been known as the Malaysia Cup.

Starting in 1974, the state teams were barred from entering the FAM Cup competition and only the club sides could enter. In 1976 Penang is the first club from Malaysia won Asian title Aga Khan Gold Cup unofficial Asian Champions' Cup.

1979 to 1988: Era of amateur football league 

Malaysian football league competition involving the representative sides of the state football associations was first held in Malaysia in 1979. When it began, it was intended primarily as a qualifying tournament for the final knock-out stages of the Malaysia Cup where teams compete in a one-round league before advanced to the knock-out stage. The top four teams at the end of the league will face off in two semi-finals before the winners made it to the finals. In 1981, the quarter-finals stage were introduced where eight teams were qualified from the preliminary stage.

However, it was not until 1982 that a league trophy was introduced to recognise the winners of the preliminary stage as the league champions which then officially started the era of nationwide level amateur football league in Malaysia. Since then, the Malaysia Cup has been held after the conclusion of the league each year, with only the best-performing teams in the league qualifying for the Malaysia Cup.

1989 to 1993: Era of semi-pro football league 

Over the years, the league competition has gained important stature in its own right. From 1982 until 1988 the league is an amateur status continue its purpose as qualifying round for Malaysia Cup and only in 1989 it is changes to a new format as Malaysian Semi-Pro Football League (MSPFL) by FAM as a 'halfway house' towards full professional status.

Initially the only teams allowed to participate in the league were the state FA's sides, teams representing the Armed Forces and the Police, and teams representing the neighbouring countries of Singapore and Brunei (though the Football Association of Singapore pulled out of the Malaysian League after the 1994 season following a dispute with the Football Association of Malaysia over gate receipts, and has not been involved since).

The inaugural season of MSPFL consisted of nine teams in Division I and eight teams in Division II with total of 17 teams participated. The Malaysian Police joined Division II in 1990. Games were played on a home and away basis for about four months roughly between the end of April or early May and the end of August or early September. Under the new format, only the top six teams in Division I and the Division II champions and runners-up will be involved in the Malaysia Cup. Malaysia Cup was played from the quarter-final stage, scheduled for November after the league was finished. The Malaysia Cup quarter-final and semi-final matches will be played on a home and away basis.

In 1990, a new national knock-out soccer competition was introduced by FAM called the Malaysia FA Cup. Perak is the winner of the inaugural season of the cup.

In 1992, FAM created another amateur league for local clubs in Malaysia to compete, which is called the Liga Nasional. The league was managed by FAM outside entity, Super Club Sdn. Bhd. Some of the clubs which compete in the league are Hong Chin, Muar FA, PKNK from Kedah, DBKL, PKNS, BSN, LPN, BBMB, Proton, PPC and PKENJ. Unfortunately, the league only ran for a one-season before it folded. Some of the clubs were then evolved and joined the main league, such as PKENJ, which became JCorp and now as JDT.

With the advent of two-league Malaysia Semi-Pro League in 1989, FAM Cup becomes the third-tier competition. In 1993, the format of the competition was changed to include a two-group league followed by the traditional knockout format. Promotion to the professional Malaysian League were introduced for the first time in 1997, Johor FC and NS Chempaka FC the first two sides to be promoted that year.

1994 to 1997: Era of professional football 

MSPFL was the nation's top-tier league until it was succeeded by the formation of Malaysian first professional football league, the Malaysia Premier League (1994–97) in 1994 by Football Association of Malaysia.

In its inaugural season 16 teams competing in the league. The teams were based from all states in Malaysia including Kuala Lumpur and addition of two foreign teams, Singapore and Brunei.

1998 to 2003: Clubs inclusion in main league 

In 1998, Malaysia Premier League was divided into two divisions consist of Malaysia Premier League 1 and Malaysia Premier League 2 (Liga Perdana 1 and Liga Perdana 2 in Malay). During this time both of the division was still just referred as Malaysian League as a whole.

During 1998, Malaysia Premier League 1 consisted of 12 teams while Malaysia Premier League 2 had 8 teams. 10 teams that previously qualified for Malaysia Cup which played in 1997 Malaysia Premier League were automatically qualified to Malaysia Premier League 1. The other two spots were filled by a playoff round of the 5 lowest teams in the 1997 Malaysia Premier League and the Malaysian Olympic football team. The lowest four teams from the playoff round were then put into Malaysia Premier League 2 alongside Police, Malaysia Military, Negeri Sembilan Chempaka F.C and PKN Johor. At this time the league still consisted of semi-pro team where each team was allowed to register 25 players where 12 players must be a professional for Malaysia Premier League 1 and a minimum of six professional players in Malaysia Premier League 2.

2004 to present: Era of Malaysia Super League 

Both leagues continued until 2003 when Football Association of Malaysia (FAM) decided to privatise the league for 2004 season onwards where Malaysia Super League was formed. Teams in Malaysia Premier League 1 and Malaysia Premier League 2 was then was put through a qualification and playoff to be promoted into Malaysia Super League. Teams that failed the qualification was put into now a new second-tier league Malaysia Premier League.

A further changes were made to Malaysia FAM Cup in 2008 where the knockout stages was abolished and double round-robin league format was introduced. The tournament in now known as Malaysia FAM League.

There are three major trophies to be won by the teams in Malaysian football competition which are Malaysia Super League, Malaysia FA Cup and Malaysia Cup.

League championships 
Unlike most of countries that plays football as a main game, the league system in Malaysia still consist of representative from state association, clubs from company, ministry or government agency.

Malaysia Super League 

The Malaysia Super League (Liga Super Malaysia) is a Malaysian professional league for association football. It is at the top flight of the Malaysian football league system and it is managed by the Football Malaysia Limited Liability Partnership (FMLLP) and partnership of FAM. The league is contested between 12 teams and operates on a system of promotion and relegation with the Malaysia Premier League. The 12 clubs participating in this top flight league need to pass a set of requirements and verification process, particularly related to professionalism and infrastructure feasibility.

Malaysia Premier League 

The Malaysia Premier League (Liga Perdana Malaysia) is the second-tier football league in Malaysia. It is at the second division in Malaysian football league system and it is also managed by the FMLLP and partnership of FAM. The league is contested between 12 teams and operates on a system of promotion and relegation with the Malaysia FAM League. The 12 clubs participating in this league need to pass a set of requirements and verification process, particularly related to professionalism and infrastructure feasibility although with lower requirement compared to the Malaysia Super League.

Malaysia M3 League 

The M3 League (Liga M3 in Malay and formerly Malaysia FAM League) is the third-tier football league in Malaysia. The tournament used to be a cup format as the FAM Cup, but it changed in 2008 as it was held as a league tournament and changing to FAM League. Malaysia FAM Cup was established in 1952 as a secondary knockout competition to the more prestigious Malaya Cup, the competition were held between the state teams including Singapore, Police, Army, and Prisons Department of Malaysia in its early days. Starting in 1974, the state teams were barred from entering the competition and only the club sides could enter.

Liga Bolasepak Rakyat 

The Liga Bolasepak Rakyat is the fourth-tier football league in Malaysia. The league is managed by Liga Bolasepak Rakyat-Limited Liability Partnership (LBR-LLP) and it is an amateur-level competition which was established in 2015 with aims to create a bigger base at grassroots level and eventually provide an alternative route for footballers under the age of 28 to make the grade. In its inaugural season, a total of 111 clubs out of more than 150 possible districts in the country compete in the league. The clubs were divided into 8 zones.

Development and youth league

President's Cup League 

The Malaysia President's Cup is developmental football competition in Malaysia for under-21 players. Since its inception, in 1985, the President's Cup has been the major tournament for under-21 and under-23 players. In 2009, the format of the competition was changed with only under-20 players eligible to be fielded for the tournament. In 2015 the format of the competition reverted to the original format with under-21 players and three over age players eligible to play.

Youth league 

The Malaysia Youth League is the youth football competition in Malaysia for under-19 players. Since its inception, in 2008, the Belia Cup has been the major tournament for under-19. In 2009 to 2011, the competition is combined with President's Cup. In 2015 the format of the competition changed to the league format.

Cups

Malaysia Cup 
The Malaysia Cup is an annual soccer tournament in Malaysia. It is currently the longest-running football competition in Asia.

Malaysia Challenge Cup 

The tournament was created for Malaysia Super League and Malaysia Premier League teams that do not qualify to the Malaysia Cup tournament through their league standings at the end of the league season. 

The first tournament was held in 2018, with 8 teams divided into 2 groups of four teams and playing a double round-robin system games. The winners and runners-up of each group qualify to knockout round, each rounds is held on a home and away basis including the final.

Malaysia FA Cup 
The Malaysia FA Cup is a national knock-out soccer competition organised by the Football Association of Malaysia. This trophy was introduced in 1990. The most successful team in this competition is Selangor FA winning 5 titles.

Sultan Haji Ahmad Shah Cup 
The Sultan Haji Ahmad Shah Cup, also known as Piala Sumbangsih is the Malaysian super cup or the Malaysia Charity Shield. It is the curtain raiser match to the new Malaysian football season, pitting the reigning Malaysia Super League champions against the previous year's winners of the Malaysia Cup. The match the cup contested upon also known as Charity Match.

Records 
Below are the record of teams in Malaysian football competitions since 1921 till present.

 Table shows teams' wins in all competitions
 The figures in bold represent the most times this competition has been won by the team
 Malaysia Super League Record Fastest goal in a match:  9 seconds
 Rafael Vitor for Penang against Perak (3 August 2021)

Hall of Fame

League

Cups

Three major professional era competitions (1994–present)

Great honours 

Great honours are titled for the team who won 2 trophies (double) and 3 trophies (treble) in the same season. It covers Malaysia top-tier division, Malaysia FA Cup, and Malaysia Cup.

Treble 

National treble is the achievement given for winning a Malaysia's top tier division which is the Malaysia Super League and its primary cup competition which is the Malaysia FA Cup and also the Malaysia Cup, the country's one of Asia's oldest footballing tournaments, in the same season.

Double 

Double is the achievement given for winning Malaysia's top tier division which is the Malaysia Super League and its primary cup competition which is the Malaysia FA Cup, Malaysia Cup and also the AFC Champions League/AFC Cup in the same season.

 In 1976 Penang is the first club from Malaysia won Asian title Aga Khan Gold Cup unofficial Asian Champions' Cup.

See also 
 Malaysia Super League
 Malaysia Premier League
 Malaysia FA Cup
 Malaysia Cup
 FAM Football Awards

References

External links 
 Football Association of Malaysia